Chulakshi Saubhaya Ranathunga (born 13 February 1989) is a Sri Lankan actress, model and beauty pageant titleholder. she was the winner of the Miss Sri Lanka title in 2014. She represented Sri Lanka in the Miss World 2014 pageant held on 14 December 2014 at the ExCeL London. She also made her debut appearance in a film in 2017's Dedunu Akase.

Filmography

References

External links

Living people
Sri Lankan beauty pageant winners
1989 births
Miss World 2014 delegates